Loiola is the name of two distinct railway stations in San Sebastián, Spain.

Loiola station (Euskotren)